Edward Rubin Griffin (born July 15, 1968) is an American comedian and actor. He is best known for portraying Eddie Sherman in the sitcom Malcolm & Eddie, the title character in the 2002 comedy film Undercover Brother, and Tiberius Jefferson "T.J." Hicks in Deuce Bigalow: Male Gigolo (1999) and Deuce Bigalow: European Gigolo (2005). He also portrayed Orpheus in Scary Movie 3 (2003) and voiced Richard Pryor on Black Dynamite (2012–2015). Griffin was ranked at number 62 on Comedy Central's list of the 100 Greatest Stand-ups of All Time.

Early life
Griffin was born in Kansas City, Missouri, and was raised by his single mother, Doris Thomas, a phone company operator. His family were Jehovah's Witnesses. In 1984, at 16 years old, he moved to Compton, California to live with his cousins. He later became a father and enlisted in the U.S. Navy but was discharged within months for using marijuana. After six months in jail on an assault conviction following a fight, he made ends meet dancing and painting houses.

Career

At a comedy club open-mic night in 1989, Griffin hopped onstage on a bet and earned a standing ovation with family stories. He talked his way into stand-up gigs around town and in L.A. One popular bit was his gay version of tough-guy comic Andrew Dice Clay, who later hired Griffin to open for him.

Once he achieved a fair amount of success in standup, Griffin became legendary at The Comedy Store for stopping in to do guest sets on open mic nights and staying up on stage long enough to tire the audience out for the hapless budding comic who had to follow him.

Griffin has appeared in films such as The Meteor Man (1993), The Walking Dead (1995) “David E. Talbert: A Fool & His Money” (1997), Deuce Bigalow: Male Gigolo (1999), Double Take (2001), Undercover Brother (2002), John Q (2002), Scary Movie 3 (2003), Deuce Bigalow: European Gigolo (2005), Norbit (2007), and Urban Justice (2007).

Griffin has appeared on television shows such as Malcolm & Eddie (1996–2000) and Chappelle's Show in the skit "World Series of Dice" as Grits n' Gravy.

Griffin performed on two tracks from Dr. Dre's 1999 album, 2001, and the intro track from The D.O.C.'s 1996 album Helter Skelter.

He has also appeared on commercials for Miller Beer's Man Laws.

In 2011, Comedy Central released Griffin's stand-up comedy special You Can Tell 'Em I Said It on DVD.

In December 2019, his stand-up comedy special, E-Niggma, was released on Showtime.

Personal life
Griffin and his mother got into an argument at his 20th birthday party when she accused him of stealing jewelry from her, which Griffin denied doing. Afterward, Griffin did not see his mother for four years until he moved back to Los Angeles, California in March 1992, to be closer with his family when his mother was injured in a car accident.

Griffin has been married four times. He married his first wife, Carla in 1984 when he was 16 years old. They divorced in 1997. He married his second wife, Rochelle, in 2002 and divorced in 2009. On September 8, 2011, he married his third wife, Nia Rivers. However, they filed for divorce after one month of marriage, citing irreconcilable differences. They were officially divorced six months later in 2012. He married his fourth wife, Ko Lee Griffin, on July 27, 2017 in Las Vegas, Nevada.

In March 2007, Griffin participated in a charity race at Irwindale Speedway to promote the film Redline, using a Ferrari Enzo owned by Daniel Sadek. During a practice run, Griffin accidentally hit the gas pedal instead of the brake and lost control of the Enzo, crashing hard into a concrete barrier. He walked away unscratched, but the $1.5 million supercar was badly damaged. Griffin later criticized reporters who suggested the crash was a publicity stunt.

During the sexual assault allegations on Bill Cosby, Griffin suggested that Cosby was the victim of a conspiracy to destroy his image and claimed, without specification, that several other prominent African-American men had been victims of similar conspiracies.

Griffin has been called out by actor, writer, producer, director, and comedian Seth Rogen due to an experience they shared in a Las Vegas elevator where Griffin is said to have made anti-Semitic remarks to Rogen, his wife Lauren Miller Rogen, and Jonah Hill.

Griffin has also been called out by the Sikh community for referring to an elderly Sikh man as "Osama Bin Laden" in the aftermath of 9/11, not understanding the difference between Sikhs and Muslims and also thinking that stereotyping Muslim Americans for the sake of "comedy" was appropriate given all the hate crimes both the Muslim and Sikh communities endured after 9/11.

Filmography

Film

Television

Music video appearances

Comedy specials

{| class="wikitable sortable"
|-
! Year
! Title
! Role
! class="unsortable" | Note
|-
| 1997
| Eddie Griffin: Voodoo Child 
| Himself 
| 
|-
| 2003
| Eddie Griffin: Dysfunktional Family 
| Himself 
| 
|-
| 2008
| Eddie Griffin: Freedom of Speech 
| Himself 
| 
|-
| 2011
| Eddie Griffin: You Can Tell 'Em I Said It! 
| Himself 
| 
|-
| 2018
| Eddie Griffin: Undeniable 
| Himself 
| 
|-
| 2019
| Eddie Griffin: E-Niggma'
| Himself 
| 
|}

Discography

Live albums

Soundtrack albums

Album appearances
1996 "Intro" (from The D.O.C. album Helter Skelter)
1998 "DP Gangsta" (from Snoop Dogg & C-Murder album Da Game Is to Be Sold, Not to Be Told)
1999 "Bar One" (with Traci Nelson and Ms. Roq) (from Dr. Dre album 2001)
1999 "Ed-ucation" (from Dr. Dre album 2001)
2002 "Bitch Ass Niggaz" (from Xzibit album Man vs. Machine)
2003 "I Thought U Knew" (with Crooked I, Eastwood & The Dramatics album Dysfunktional Family) (Various artists)
2003 "Dys-Funk-Tional" (from Spider Loc & Eddie Griffin album Dysfunktional Family) (Various artists)
2008 "Take A Ride Skit" & "Feed The Lions Skit" (from T-Pain album Thr33 Ringz'')

Awards

References

External links

Eddie Griffin Going For Broke Official Site @ VH1.com

1968 births
Living people
Male actors from Kansas City, Missouri
American male film actors
African-American film producers
Film producers from Missouri
African-American stand-up comedians
American stand-up comedians
African-American television producers
American television producers
African-American male actors
American male television actors
Comedians from Missouri
20th-century American comedians
21st-century American comedians
20th-century African-American people
21st-century African-American people